Jimmie Bones (born James Trombly) is the organ/piano/keyboard/harmonica player in Kid Rock's Twisted Brown Trucker Band.
The two met while Kid Rock was recording "Early Mornin Stoned Pimp" at Detroit's White Room Studio in 1995.  Rock asked Bones to do some piano tracks while Bones was working as a member of Robert Bradley's Blackwater Surprise in the adjacent room to Rock. Rock and Bradley also shared a rehearsal space and Bones would show up early for his rehearsal and sit in on the last bit of Rock's rehearsal.  Rock suggested to Bones that he should do some live performances with him and the forming Twisted Brown Trucker Band when not touring with Bradley and Bones agreed, eventually becoming Rock's full-time keyboardist.  Bones soon began contributing backing vocals and harmonica as well as co-writing credits with Rock and Uncle Kracker.  Bones is featured heavily on the Uncle Kracker debut "Double Wide" on keyboards and backing vocals notably the backing vocals on the hit single "Follow Me". Previous to his national success, Jimmie fronted seminal Detroit hard rock band Jimmie Bones and the Graverobbers in the early 1990s. The Graverobbers line-up consisted of lead vocalist/organist Jimmie Bones, lead guitar Lou Simon (Louie), bass guitar Larry Ritts (Spyder Webb), and drummer Rob Lull (Rob Graves).

Jimmie Bones cites Billy Preston as his biggest influence.

References

External links
Reverb Nation profile

Living people
Year of birth missing (living people)
Place of birth missing (living people)
Singers from Detroit
21st-century American keyboardists
21st-century American male singers
21st-century American singers